Luca Polizzi (born 28 May 1996 in Belgium) is a Belgian footballer.

Career

In 2016, Polizzi signed with NK Inter Zaprešić in Croatia, making 19 league appearances there. 

After playing for Cypriot clubs Apollon Limassol, Olympiakos Nicosia, and Pafos, he expressed desire to return to Belgium to be closer with his family.

References

External links
 Luca Polizzi at Soccerway

Belgian footballers
Association football midfielders
1996 births
Living people
Footballers from Brussels
MVV Maastricht players
NK Inter Zaprešić players
Apollon Limassol FC players
Olympiakos Nicosia players
Pafos FC players
K. Rupel Boom F.C. players
Belgian people of Italian descent